The Jacob Vosseller House is a historic building at 664 Foothill Road in Bridgewater Township, Somerset County, New Jersey. The house was built . It was known as Castner's Tavern, and later Allen's Tavern, during the 19th century. The house was added to the National Register of Historic Places on January 23, 1986, for its significance in architecture, commerce, settlement, and transportation.

References

External links
 
 

National Register of Historic Places in Somerset County, New Jersey
Houses on the National Register of Historic Places in New Jersey
New Jersey Register of Historic Places
Bridgewater Township, New Jersey
Houses completed in 1753
Georgian architecture in New Jersey